Kalifornsky may refer to:

 Peter Kalifornsky (1911–1993), a writer from Kenai, Alaska
 Kalifornsky, Alaska, a Dena'ina Athabaskan village and census-designated place (CDP) in Kenai Peninsula Borough named after Peter Kalifornsky